Charlie-Shalom Biton (born 11 April 1947) is an Israeli social activist and former politician who served as a member of the Knesset for Hadash and the Black Panthers between 1977 and 1992.

Biography
Charlie Biton was born in Casablanca in Morocco. His family immigrated to Israel in 1949 when he was two years old. He grew up in Musrara neighbourhood of Jerusalem and attended an ORT vocational school. In 1971 he was one of the founders of the Israeli Black Panthers movement, along with Sa'adia Marciano, Reuven Abergel, and Eli Avichzer.  In 1974, he was sentenced to seven months in prison for assaulting a police officer. He went into hiding to avoid his sentence, and was later pardoned.

Political career
As the Black Panthers became aligned with Hadash, Biton was elected to the Knesset on the party's list in 1977. He was re-elected in 1981, 1984 and 1988. On 25 December 1990, he left Hadash to establish his own faction. The faction's name was not initially approved by the House Committee, but on 1 January 1991 it was named Black Panthers.

In the 1992 Knesset elections he headed a list named Hatikva, but it won only 2,053 votes (0.1%), well below the 1.5% electoral threshold, and Biton lost his seat.

See also 

 Kochavi Shemesh
 Matzpen

References

External links
 

1947 births
People from Casablanca
20th-century Moroccan Jews
Moroccan emigrants to Israel
Leaders of political parties in Israel
Jewish socialists
Living people
Hadash politicians
Black Panthers (Israel) politicians
Members of the 9th Knesset (1977–1981)
Members of the 10th Knesset (1981–1984)
Members of the 11th Knesset (1984–1988)
Members of the 12th Knesset (1988–1992)